Ken Ferguson (born March 21, 1944) was a Canadian football player who played for the Edmonton Eskimos, BC Lions and Hamilton Tiger-Cats. He won the Grey Cup with Hamilton in 1972. He played college football at Utah State University.

References

1944 births
Living people
BC Lions players
Edmonton Elks players
Hamilton Tiger-Cats players
Players of Canadian football from Saskatchewan
Sportspeople from Saskatoon
Utah State Aggies football players
Canadian football offensive linemen
Canadian players of American football